Gadilidae is a family of tusk shells in the order Gadilida.

Genera
 Bathycadulus Scarabino, 1995    
 Cadulus Philippi, 1844 
 Dischides Jeffreys, 1867      
 Gadila Gray, 1847
 Polyschides Pilsbry & Sharp, 1898    
 Sagamicadulus Sakurai & Shimazu, 1963    
 Siphonodentalium M. Sars, 1859    
 Striocadulus Emerson, 1962

References

External links

Scaphopods